The 49ers–Rams rivalry is a rivalry between the San Francisco 49ers and the Los Angeles Rams of the National Football League (NFL). The intensity of the rivalry is also due to the fact that Northern California (where the 49ers are based) and Southern California (where the Rams are based) have long been competitors in the economic, cultural, and political arenas. 

During the Rams' 21 years in St. Louis, the rivalry did not have the geographical lore it once had, but games were still intense regardless of the standings. With the Rams’ return to Los Angeles in 2016, the rivalry became geographic once again. Sports Illustrated considers their rivalry the 8th best of all time in the NFL.

The teams have met twice in the NFL playoffs, once in the 1989 NFC Championship Game with a 30–3 49ers victory and again in the 2021 NFC Championship Game with a 20–17 Rams victory.

History
In 1950, the National Football League merged with the All-America Football Conference thus gaining three new teams. One of these teams was the San Francisco 49ers making them the second NFL franchise located on the West Coast, the first one being the Los Angeles Rams who had re-located from Cleveland in 1946. The NFL placed both of them in the newly formed National Conference (1950–52) guaranteeing that they would play each other twice during the regular season. In 1953, the National Conference was renamed the Western Conference and the American Conference was renamed the Eastern Conference which remained in place until the AFL merger forced re-alignment in 1970. For the 1967, 1968 and 1969 seasons immediately preceding the 1970 re-alignment, now with 16 franchises, the NFL divided the Western and Eastern Conferences into two Divisions of four teams each, ironically very similar to the present day conferences resulting from the 2002 re-alignment. The 49ers and Rams remained together in the Coastal Division of the Western Conference (1967–1969) and then in the NFC West Division since 1970. Owing to the strength of their rivalry, the 49ers and Rams have remained in place as the only two teams in the NFC West Division continuously since 1970, despite the Rams re-location to Saint Louis in 1995 and further re-alignment in 2002. They have met twice every season beginning in 1950. The teams have met twice in the NFL Playoffs. Their first postseason meeting was in the NFC Championship Game following the 1989 season at Candlestick Park in San Francisco. This resulted in a 30–3 victory by the 49ers on January 14, 1990, immediately preceding their fourth Super Bowl appearance. On January 30, 2022, they would again meet in the NFC Championship Game at Los Angeles' Sofi Stadium where the Rams would break a six-game losing skid to the 49ers, winning 20-17 en route a victory in Super Bowl LVI.

1950s
The first meeting between the teams took place on October 1, 1950, in San Francisco. The Rams were alternating starting quarterbacks between Bob Waterfield and Norm Van Brocklin during the 1950 season. Waterfield was the starter for the game, but during the second quarter San Francisco's Pete Wissman landed a hard tackle on the Los Angeles quarterback. Van Brocklin filled in for Waterfield, and the Rams went on to win the game 35–14. The two teams played each other again on November 5, 1950, at the Los Angeles Memorial Coliseum in Los Angeles. After beating the Baltimore Colts 70–21 and the Detroit Lions 65–24, the Rams were favored to beat the 49ers by 20 points. Yet, the 49ers played a very physical game and only lost by a touchdown holding the Rams offensive powerhouse to only 28 points.

The 49ers got their first win against the Rams on October 28, 1951. The 49ers secondary was able to pick off Van Brocklin six times, more than half of the interceptions that he threw all season. The 49ers held the Rams to just 17 points, the lowest they put up all season and were able to capitalize on the turnovers en route to a 44–17 victory.

1960s
The rivalry was almost even through the decade, with the Rams holding a 10-9-1 edge. The 49ers were also-rans throughout the 1960s, while the Rams did not contend until the arrival of coach George Allen in 1966. In 1967, the 49ers and Rams were placed in the Coastal Division of the NFL's Western Conference with the Atlanta Falcons (who remained a rival in the NFC West through 2001) and Baltimore Colts.

1970s
After the AFL-NFL merger, both teams were placed in the NFC West, and were the only teams required to be in the same division by the merger agreement.  The rivalry was at its pinnacle during the 1970s. From 1970 to 1979 one of the two teams won the division each season. The decade also featured 10 and 8-game win streaks by the Rams (the 8-game streak stretched into the early 1980s). The 49ers were the NFC West's top team in the beginning of the decade winning the first three post merger division crowns despite going 1–5 in that period vs. the Rams. The Rams answered right back winning seven straight division crowns from 1973 to 1979, culminating with Super Bowl XIV loss to the Pittsburgh Steelers.

1980s
On January 2, 1983, a 1–7 Rams team met the 3–5 defending Super Bowl champion 49ers in San Francisco for the last game of the 1982 season (a players' strike shortened the season to 9 games), with the 49ers needing a win to make the playoffs. The Rams led late in the 4th quarter 21–20 until 49ers quarterback Joe Montana led a two-minute drive, putting the 49ers in position for a short field goal. But Ivory Sully blocked Ray Wersching's kick to preserve a 21–20 win and knock the 49ers out of the playoffs.

On January 14, 1990, the two teams met in the 1989 NFC Championship game. The Rams were heavy underdogs but had already pulled off two upsets on the road in the playoffs (over the Eagles and Giants). The Rams took an early 3–0 lead and were driving again, but Rams quarterback Jim Everett noticed a wide open Flipper Anderson a second too late and the pass was knocked away by 49ers safety Ronnie Lott. Instead of a 10–0 Rams lead, Montana led the 49ers on a touchdown drive and San Francisco took the lead 7–3. The 49ers would win the game, 30–3.

1990s
The 49ers dominated the rivalry during the 1990s, winning 17 straight games against the Rams. Yet, some players did not believe so. Roger Craig stated in Tales from the San Francisco 49ers Sideline that "the Rams will always be the 49ers' biggest rival. It doesn't matter if they no longer play in Los Angeles. If the Rams played their home games on Mars, it would still be a rivalry."

By the end of the  season, San Francisco lead in the all-time series (49–48–2) for the first time ever.  The Rams previously lead in the series by as many as 22 games in 1980.  The 49ers lead in the series was short-lived, however, as St. Louis won both games against San Francisco during their championship season in 1999 to retake the lead.

2000s
The Rams and their Greatest Show on Turf offense (1999-2001) regained the upper hand against San Francisco with 6 consecutive regular season victories against them in that time period right after having previously dropped 17 straight games including one playoff loss in the 1989 NFC Championship game. Ultimately, in the early 2000s, they went 8–2 against the 49ers from 2000 to 2004.  But both teams fell into decline and neither team was a playoff contender as the decade wore on. The 49ers had the upper hand during the latter part of the decade, going 8–2 against St. Louis from 2005 to 2009.

During the  realignment, only the Rams and 49ers would remain in the NFC West, as their former division rivals, the Atlanta Falcons, Carolina Panthers, and New Orleans Saints, would all move to the newly formed NFC South.  The Rams and 49ers would be joined by the Arizona Cardinals and Seattle Seahawks in the "new" NFC West.

2010s
In 2011, the 49ers took the all-time series lead for the first time in 13 years.  The Rams tied it back up with a win at Edward Jones Dome in 2012, but then they lost both 2013 games to the 49ers.

In 2016, the Rams returned to Los Angeles, making it a restoring of the Bay Area-Los Angeles rivalry. San Francisco finished 25–16–1 against the Rams during their time in St. Louis.

The Rams were the only team to lose to the 49ers in 2016, as the 49ers swept the two-game series against the Rams but went 0–14 against the rest of the NFL. The two teams won one NFC championship each to close out the decade (Los Angeles in 2018, San Francisco in 2019), but neither team won the Super Bowl. In 2019, the second 49ers–Rams game was in Week 15; the Rams held an early 21–10 lead, but the 49ers came back, defeating Los Angeles 34–31 to knock the Rams out of playoff contention.

2020s
It was the Rams' first-ever loss in their new venue SoFi Stadium. In , the 49ers again won both head-to-head meetings. This included the regular season finale in Los Angeles, which had playoff implications for both sides. The Rams were already in the playoffs but could clinch the NFC West title with a win, while the 49ers needed a win to make it into the playoffs. The Rams held a 17–0 lead late in the second quarter, but the 49ers came back to win 27–24 in overtime, clinching a playoff spot. Ultimately the Rams won the NFC West anyway as the Arizona Cardinals lost their final game.

On January 30, 2022, the 49ers and Rams met for the NFC Championship Game in Los Angeles. Although the Rams had lost six consecutive games to the 49ers heading into this important game, the Rams, when it mattered most, won 20–17 despite trailing by 10 in the fourth quarter. After finally defeating their rival, the Rams ultimately went on to win Super Bowl LVI.

Game results

|-
| 
| style="| 
| style="| Rams  35–14
| style="| Rams  28–21
| Rams  2–0
| 49ers move from the All-America Football Conference and are placed in the NFL Western Conference along with the Rams.  
|-
| 
| Tie 1–1
| style="| 49ers  44–17
| style="| Rams  23–16
| Rams  3–1
| Rams win 1951 NFL Championship.
|-
| 
| style="| 
| style="| Rams  34–21
| style="| Rams  35–9
| Rams  5–1
| 
|-
| 
| style="| 
| style="| 49ers  31–30
| style="| 49ers  31–27
| Rams  5–3
| 
|-
| 
| style="| 
| style="| Rams  42–34
| Tie  24–24
| Rams  6–3–1
| 
|-
| 
| style="| 
| style="| Rams  23–14
| style="| Rams  27–14
| Rams  8–3–1
| Rams lose 1955 NFL Championship.
|-
| 
| Tie 1–1
| style="| 49ers  33–30
| style="| Rams  30–6
| Rams  9–4–1
| 
|-
| 
| Tie 1–1
| style="| 49ers  23–20
| style="| Rams  37–24
| Rams  10–5–1
| Rams' home game was played in front of 102,368 fans, an NFL attendance record that stood until 2009.
|-
| 
| style="| 
| style="| Rams  33–3
| style="| Rams  56–7
| Rams  12–5–1
| Rams' 56–7 win is the biggest blowout in the history of the rivalry.
|-
| 
| style="| 
| style="| 49ers  34–0
| style="| 49ers  24–16
| Rams  12–7–1
| 
|-

|-
| 
| style="| 
| style="| 49ers  23–7
| style="| 49ers  13–9
| Rams  12–9–1
| 
|-
| 
| Tie 1–1
| style="| 49ers  35–0
| style="| Rams  17–7
| Rams  13–10–1
| 
|-
| 
| Tie 1–1
| style="| Rams  28–14
| style="| 49ers  24–17
| Rams  14–11–1
| 
|-
| 
| style="| 
| style="| Rams  21–17
| style="| Rams  28–21
| Rams  16–11–1
| 
|-
| 
| Tie 1–1
| style="| 49ers  28–7
| style="| Rams  42–14
| Rams  17–12–1
| 
|-
| 
| style="| 
| style="| 49ers  45–21
| style="| 49ers  30–27
| Rams  17–14–1
| 
|-
| 
| Tie 1–1
| style="| 49ers  21–13
| style="| Rams  34–3
| Rams  18–15–1
| 
|-
| 
| Tie 1–1
| style="| Rams  17–7
| style="| 49ers  27–24
| Rams  19–16–1
| 
|-
| 
| style="| 
| Tie  20–20
| style="| Rams  24–10
| Rams  20–16–2
|
|-
| 
| style="| 
| style="| Rams  27–21
| style="| Rams  41–30
| Rams  22–16–2
| 
|-

|-
| 
| Tie 1–1
| style="| Rams  30–13
| style="| 49ers  20–6
| Rams  23–17–2
| Both teams placed in the NFC West after AFL-NFL merger.
|-
| 
| style="| 
| style="| Rams  20–13
| style="| Rams  17–6
| Rams  25–17–2
| 49ers open Candlestick Park.
|-
| 
| style="| 
| style="| Rams  26–16
| style="| Rams  31–7
| Rams  27–17–2
| 
|-
| 
| style="| 
| style="| Rams  37–14
| style="| Rams  31–13
| Rams  29–17–2
| 
|-
| 
| style="| 
| style="| Rams  15–13
| style="| Rams  37–14
| Rams  31–17–2
|
|-
| 
| Tie 1–1
| style="| Rams  23–14
| style="| 49ers  24–23
| Rams  32–18–2
| Rams win 10 straight meetings (1970–75).
|-
| 
| Tie 1–1
| style="| Rams  23–3
| style="| 49ers  16–0
| Rams  33–19–2
|
|-
| 
| style="| 
| style="| Rams  23–10
| style="| Rams  34–14
| Rams  35–19–2
| 
|-
| 
| style="| 
| style="| Rams  31–28
| style="| Rams  27–10
| Rams  37–19–2
| 
|-
| 
| style="| 
| style="| Rams  26–20
| style="| Rams  27–24
| Rams  39–19–2
| Rams lose Super Bowl XIV.
|-

|-
| 
| style="| 
| style="| Rams  31–17
| style="| Rams  48–26
| Rams  41–19–2 
| Rams win 12 straight games in San Francisco (1969–80).  Rams move to Anaheim Stadium.
|-
| 
| style="| 
| style="| 49ers  20–17
| style="| 49ers  33–31
| Rams  41–21–2
| 49ers sweep season series for first time since 1965.  49ers win Super Bowl XVI.
|-
| 
| Tie 1–1
| style="| Rams  21–20
| style="| 49ers  30–24
| Rams  42–22–2
| Both games played despite players strike reducing the season to 9 games.  Rams block a potential 49ers' game-winning field goal in the final seconds of the game in San Francisco.
|-
| 
| Tie 1–1
| style="| Rams  10-7
| style="| 49ers  45-35
| Rams  43–23–2 
| 
|-
| 
| style="| 
| style="| 49ers  19–16
| style="| 49ers  33–0
| Rams  43–25–2
| 49ers win Super Bowl XIX.
|-
| 
| Tie 1–1
| style="| Rams  27–20
| style="| 49ers  28–14
| Rams  44–26–2 
| 
|-
| 
| Tie 1–1
| style="| 49ers  24–14
| style="| Rams  16–13
| Rams  45–27–2 
| 
|-
| 
| style="| 
| style="| 49ers  48–0
| style="| 49ers  31–10
| Rams  45–29–2
|
|-
| 
| Tie 1–1
| style="| Rams  38–16
| style="| 49ers  24–21
| Rams  46–30–2 
| 49ers win Super Bowl XXIII.
|-
| 
| Tie 1–1
| style="| Rams  13–12
| style="| 49ers  30–27
| Rams  47–31–2 
|49ers win Super Bowl XXIV.
|- style="font-weight:bold;background:#f2f2f2;"
| 1989 Playoffs
| style="| 
| style="| 49ers  30–3
| 
| Rams  47–32–2
| NFC Championship Game.  First playoff meeting between the two teams.
|-

|-
| 
| Tie 1–1
| style="| Rams  28–17
| style="| 49ers  26–10
| Rams  48–33–2 
| 
|-
| 
| style="| 
| style="| 49ers  27–10
| style="| 49ers  33–10
| Rams  48–35–2
| 
|-
| 
| style="| 
| style="| 49ers  27–24
| style="| 49ers  27–10
| Rams  48–37–2
| 
|-
| 
| style="| 
| style="| 49ers  40–17
| style="| 49ers  35–10
| Rams  48–39–2
| 
|-
| 
| style="| 
| style="| 49ers  31–27
| style="| 49ers  34–19
| Rams  48–41–2
| 49ers win Super Bowl XXIX.
|-
| 
| style="| 
| style="| 49ers  41–13
| style="| 49ers  44–10
| Rams  48–43–2
| Rams re-locate to St. Louis, play at Busch Memorial Stadium for 1995 season.
|-
| 
| style="| 
| style="| 49ers  34–0
| style="| 49ers  28–11
| Rams  48–45–2
| Rams open Trans World Dome (now known as The Dome at America's Center).
|-
| 
| style="| 
| style="| 49ers  30–10
| style="| 49ers  15–12
| Rams  48–47–2
|  
|-
| 
| style="| 
| style="| 49ers  38–19
| style="| 49ers  28–10
| 49ers  49–48–2
| 49ers win 17 straight meetings (1990–98) and 12 straight meetings in LA/St. Louis (1987–98).  49ers take lead in the series for the first time.
|-
| 
| style="| 
| style="| Rams  23–7
| style="| Rams  42–20
| Rams  50–49–2 
| Rams' first season sweep since 1980.  Rams win Super Bowl XXXIV.
|-

|-
| 
| style="| 
| style="| Rams  34–24
| style="| Rams  41–24
| Rams  52–49–2 
| 
|-
| 
| style="| 
| style="| Rams  30–26
| style="| Rams  27–14
| Rams  54–49–2 
| Rams lose Super Bowl XXXVI.
|-
| 
| Tie 1–1
| style="| 49ers  37–13
| style="| Rams  31–20
| Rams  55–50–2 
| 
|-
| 
| Tie 1–1
| style="| 49ers  30–10
| style="| Rams  27–24(OT)
| Rams  56–51–2 
| 
|-
| 
| style="| 
| style="| Rams  24–14
| style="| Rams  16–6
| Rams  58–51–2 
| 
|-
| 
| style="| 
| style="| 49ers  28–25
| style="| 49ers  24–20
| Rams  58–53–2
| 
|-
| 
| Tie 1–1
| style="| 49ers  20–13
| style="| Rams  20–17
| Rams  59–54–2 
| 
|-
| 
| Tie 1–1
| style="| Rams  13–9
| style="| 49ers  17–16
| Rams  60–55–2 
| 
|-
| 
| style="| 
| style="| 49ers  35–16
| style="| 49ers  17–16
| Rams  60–57–2
| 
|-
| 
| style="| 
| style="| 49ers  35–0
| style="| 49ers  28–6
| Rams  60–59–2
| 
|-

|-
| 
| Tie 1–1
| style="| 49ers  23–20(OT)
| style="| Rams  25–17
| Rams  61–60–2
| 
|-
| 
| style="| 
| style="| 49ers  26–0
| style="| 49ers  34–27
| 49ers  62–61–2
| 
|-
| 
| style="| 
| Tie  
| style="| Rams  
| Tie  62–62–3
| Only tie game in the series since the 1974 introduction of overtime in regular season games.  The Rams had what would have been a game-winning field goal taken away because of a penalty. The Rams kicked a field goal as time expired in OT of the second game, narrowly averting a second straight tie. 49ers lose Super Bowl XLVII.
|-
| 
| style="| 
| style="| 49ers  23–13
| style="| 49ers  35–11
| 49ers  64–62–3
| 
|-
| 
| Tie 1–1
| style="| Rams  13–10
| style="| 49ers  31–17
| 49ers  65–63–3
| 49ers open Levi's Stadium in Santa Clara.
|-
| 
| Tie 1–1
| style="| 49ers  19–16(OT)
| style="| Rams  27–6
| 49ers  66–64–3
| Game in Santa Clara is Rams’ last game as a St. Louis-based franchise.
|-
| 
| style="| 
| style="| 49ers  28–0
| style="| 49ers  22–21
| 49ers  68–64–3
| Rams return to the Los Angeles Memorial Coliseum in LA.  49ers' wins over the Rams are their only wins in a 2–14 season.  49ers' 9th shutout win in team history vs. Rams. Rams draft Jared Goff.
|-
| 
| Tie 1–1
| style="| Rams  41–39
| style="| 49ers  34–13
| 49ers  69–65–3
| 
|-
| 
| style="| 
| style="| Rams  39–10
| style="| Rams  48–32
| 49ers  69–67–3
| Rams sweep season series for first time since 2004, and clinch first-round bye in their home win in week 17.  Rams lose Super Bowl LIII.
|-
| 
| style="| 
| style="| 49ers  34–31
| style="| 49ers  20–7
| 49ers  71–67–3
| 49ers eliminate Rams from playoff contention with win in Santa Clara.  49ers lose Super Bowl LIV.
|-

|-
| 
| style="| 
| style="| 49ers  24–16
| style="| 49ers  23–20
| 49ers  73–67–3
| No fans in attendance for either game due to COVID-19 pandemic. Rams open SoFi Stadium in Inglewood.
|-
| 
| style="| 
| style="| 49ers  31–10
| style="| 49ers  
| 49ers  75–67–3
| Rams trade Jared Goff for Matthew Stafford. 49ers overcome 17–0 deficit, clinch playoff berth in game in Los Angeles. Rams win Super Bowl LVI.
|-
|- style="font-weight:bold;background:#f2f2f2;"
| 2021 Playoffs
| style="| 

| 
| style="| Rams  20–17 
| 49ers  75–68–3
| NFC Championship Game. First playoff meeting since 1989.  Rams come back from 17–7 deficit in fourth quarter.
|-
| 
| style="| | style="| 49ers  24–9| style="| 49ers  31–14| 49ers  77–68–3
| 49ers win 8 straight regular season meetings (2019–22). Rams finish the season with a 5–12 record, becoming the worst defending champion in the Super Bowl era.
|- 

|-
| Regular season
| style="|| 49ers 37–34–2
| 49ers 39–33–1
| 49ers lead the series in Los Angeles 28–23–1 and won the series in St. Louis 11–10
|-
| Postseason
| Tie 1–1| 49ers 1–0
| Rams 1–0
| NFC Championship Game: 1989, 2021
|-
| Regular and postseason 
| style="|'''
| 49ers 38–34–2
| 49ers 39–34–1
| 
|-

See also
Dodgers–Giants rivalry
Northern California – Southern California rivalry
Kings–Sharks rivalry
California Clásico
Chargers–Raiders rivalry

Notes

References

Specific

General
 49ers vs Rams Results
 
 
 

National Football League rivalries
San Francisco 49ers
Los Angeles Rams
1950 establishments in California
San Francisco 49ers rivalries
Los Angeles Rams rivalries